Neotephritis cinerea is a species of tephritid or fruit flies in the genus Neotephritis of the family Tephritidae.

Distribution
Chile, Brazil, Argentina.

References

Tephritinae
Insects described in 1852
Diptera of South America